Wakaleo oldfieldi is an extinct species of marsupial lions of the genus Wakaleo, found in Miocene deposits of South Australia. It had three unfused molar teeth instead of two fused molars as is the case with the Pleistocene Thylacoleo carnifex.

As with Thylacoleo carnifex, this species is presumed to have used its maxillary (upper) teeth to hold its food and sharpen the mandibular teeth, the latter were also used in slicing and stabbing during eating. The premolars also had a crescent-shaped circumference for slicing.

Taxonomy 
A description of the species was published in 1974. It is a species of Wakaleo, marsupial carnivores also found at other fossil sites in Australia.

References

External links
Mikko's Phylogeny Archive
Australias Lost Kingdom
Information fromCSIRO
A picture of the specimen's mandible

Miocene mammals of Australia
Miocene marsupials
Wakaleo
Fossil taxa described in 1974
Taxa named by William A. Clemens Jr.